Embankment may refer to:

Geology and geography 
 A levee, an artificial bank raised above the immediately surrounding land to redirect or prevent flooding by a river, lake or sea
 Embankment (earthworks), a raised bank to carry a road, railway, or canal across a low-lying or wet area
 Embankment dam, a dam made of  mounded  earth and rock
 Land reclamation along river banks, usually marked by roads and walkways running along it, parallel to the river, as in:
 The Thames Embankment along the north side of the Thames River in London, England
 The Victoria Embankment contained within the Thames Embankments 
 The Chelsea Embankment contained within the Thames Embankment
 The Albert Embankment along the south side of the Thames River in London, England
 The Neva embankments along the Neva River in Saint Petersburg, Russia
 Embankment tube station, a station on the London Underground

Arts 
 "Embankment", a work by artist Rachel Whiteread